Etowah 
is a Muskogee (Creek) word for 'town'/'people'/'tribe', 
and may also refer to:

Places in the United States
 The Etowah River in Georgia
 Etowah, Arkansas
 Etowah, Georgia
 Etowah, North Carolina
 Etowah, Oklahoma
 Etowah, Tennessee
 Etowah, West Virginia
 Etowah County, Alabama
 Etowah Indian Mounds in Bartow County, Georgia

Other
 Etowah (horse), the 1913 winner of the Kentucky Futurity trotting stakes race

See also
Etawah (disambiguation), place names in India